Silberstraße is a formerly independent parish in the German state of Saxony. Since 1999 it has been part of the borough of Wilkau-Haßlau, in  the district of Zwickau. As well as the old village houses it also has a newly built residential area with modern housing units, large industrial estates with textile firms and agricultural concerns.

Geography

Location 

The village lies as the foot of the Ore Mountains in a valley basin, about 10 kilometres south of Zwickau and is divided by the Zwickauer Mulde river.

Neighbouring parishes 

Its adjacent municipalities are Reinsdorf with the villages of Vielau and Friedrichsgrün, as well as the towns of Kirchberg and Wildenfels in the district of Zwickau.

References

External links 
 

Zwickau (district)
Former municipalities in Saxony
Villages in the Ore Mountains